The Ogden Mills House was a former mansion located on 2 East 69th Street in the Upper East Side of Manhattan in New York City.

History
The Ogden Mills House was designed by famed architect Richard Morris Hunt and overlooked Central Park.  It was constructed at the corner of East 69th Street and Park Avenue in the Upper East Side for Ogden Mills between 1885 and 1887.  It was located across the street from both the E. H. Harriman town house and 1 East 70th Street, a mansion constructed in 1912–1914 by Thomas Hastings of Carrère and Hastings, which today houses the Frick Collection of Carnegie Steel Company chairman Henry Clay Frick.

Unlike Hunt's 1886 project, built in the Châteauesque style and known as the Petit Chateau for William K. Vanderbilt, the Ogden Mills House was much more restrained in its style.

After Mills' death in 1929, the home was left to his son, U.S. Treasury Secretary and U.S. Representative Ogden Livingston Mills, who died at the residence on October 11, 1937.  The house was torn down in the late 1930s and an apartment building was erected in its place.

See also

Staatsburgh State Historic Site (also owned by Mills)

References

Further reading 
 

Buildings and structures demolished in the 1930s
Demolished buildings and structures in Manhattan
Fifth Avenue
Gilded Age
Houses completed in 1887
Houses in Manhattan
Upper East Side